Cullis is a surname. Notable people with the surname include:

Anthony Cullis (born 1946), British electronic engineer
Cuthbert Edmund Cullis (1868–1954), English mathematician 
Eleanor Cullis-Hill (1913–2001), Australian architect
Kevin Cullis (born 1958), English football manager
Severn Cullis-Suzuki (born 1979), Canadian environmental activist, speaker, television host, and author
Stan Cullis (1916–2001), English football player and manager
Winifred Cullis (1875–1956), British physician and academic